The 1904 Iowa Hawkeyes football team represented the University of Iowa in the 1904 Western Conference football season.

Schedule

References

Iowa
Iowa Hawkeyes football seasons
Iowa Hawkeyes football